Brett Martin may refer to:
 Brett Martin (baseball) (born 1995), American professional baseball pitcher
 Brett Martin (squash player) (born 1963), Australian professional squash player